Roman Borisovich Berdnikov (born 31 August 1974) is a Russian lieutenant general and current Commander of the Western Military District as of October 3, 2022. He previously commanded the Russian military intervention in Syria. He commanded the 59th Separate Motor Rifle Brigade and, subsequently, the 29th Combined Arms Army.

Biography
Roman Borisovich Berdnikov was born on 31 August 1974 in the town of Kamen-na-Obi, Altai Territory. From 1981 to 1989 he studied at the city school number 4. In 1989 he entered the Suvorov Military School in Kiev. He graduated in 1991 and immediately joined the Moscow Higher Military Command School, wherefrom he graduated in 1995. He married in 1993 as a cadet. He also participated in the 1995 Moscow Victory Day Parades. 

After commissioning, Berdnikov began service as a motor rifle platoon commander in Novosibirsk, rising to the rank of chief of staff of a motor rifle regiment there. Berdnikov graduated from the Combined Arms Academy in 2003. After commanding a regiment for 2.5 years, Berdnikov became a deputy brigade commander. He took command of the 59th Separate Motor Rifle Brigade of the Eastern Military District in February 2012 and was promoted to the rank of major general on 11 June 2014. He continued commanding the brigade until August 2014, when he joined the Military Academy of the General Staff. 

Upon graduation, he was appointed commander of the 29th Combined Arms Army on 4 March 2019 where his earnings were declared as 3,674,904.53 rubles (equivalent to roughly 56,000 US dollars), about a million more rubles than the previous year. He was promoted to the rank of lieutenant general on 10 December 2020.

In October 2021, he was appointed Commander of the Group of Forces of the Armed Forces of the Russian Federation in the Syrian Arab Republic. Berdnikov was still in Syria as of 9 May 2022, when he reviewed the Victory Day Parade at Khmeimim Air Base.

In early June 2022, rumours spread that Berdnikov was killed in Ukraine in the course of the Russo-Ukrainian War, although some sources argue that the fatality was that of general Roman Kutuzov, whose death was confirmed by Russian media on 5 June.

According to unconfirmed media reports, on 28 September 2022 he was appointed Commander of the Russia’s Western Military District, replacing Colonel General Alexander Zhuravlyov.

Awards
 Order of Merit for the Fatherland, 4th class with swords
 Order of Alexander Nevsky
 Order of Military Merit
 Medal of Suvorov
 Jubilee Medal "50 Years of Victory in the Great Patriotic War of 1941–1945"

References

1979 births
Living people
People from Altai Krai
Russian lieutenant generals
Eastern Ukraine offensive
Russian military personnel of the Syrian civil war
Russian military personnel of the 2022 Russian invasion of Ukraine
Frunze Military Academy alumni
Military Academy of the General Staff of the Armed Forces of Russia alumni
20th-century Russian military personnel
21st-century Russian military personnel